Blue Angel is the only album released in 1980 by the band of the same name. They were fronted by a pre-fame Cyndi Lauper. The band was fairly short-lived and the album was not a major success until after Lauper's solo career exploded. It has been released on five occasions:

 1980 on Polydor Records on vinyl and cassette (Red Cover) [PD/CT-1-6300]
 1984 on Polydor Records on vinyl and cassette (Yellow Cover) [Australian only re-release, 2391 486]
 1986 on Polydor/Reed Records on vinyl and cassette (U.S. only re-release) [827 560-1/4 Y]
 2005 on Universal Records on vinyl and CD (5,000 copy limited edition) [B0004239-02]
 2007 on iTunes

Track listing
All songs written by Cyndi Lauper and John Turi except where noted.
"Maybe He'll Know"
"I Had a Love"
"Fade"
"Anna Blue"
"Can't Blame Me"
"Late" (Lauper, Turi, Lee Brovitz)
"Cut Out"  (T.J. Fowler, Tom King, Ira Mack)
"Take a Chance"
"Just the Other Day"
"I'm Gonna Be Strong"  (Barry Mann, Cynthia Weil)
"Lorraine"
"Everybody's Got an Angel"  (Blue Angel, Henry Gross)

Demo tracks have leaked to the internet that did not appear on the album. Titles include "Don't Know," "Magazine Cover," "What a Thrill" and "Witness". Many tracks were later re-recorded by Lauper including "What a Thrill," "Witness", "Maybe He'll Know" and "I'm Gonna Be Strong".

Personnel
Blue Angel
Cyndi Lauper – lead singer, acoustic piano
John Turi – keyboards, saxophone
Johnny "Bullet" Morelli – drums
Lee Brovitz – bass
Arthur "Rockin' A" Neilson – guitar
Technical
Roy Halee – production, engineer
Lincoln Y. Clapp – assistant engineer
Benno Friedman – photography
Stephanie Zuras – design
Bob Heimall – art direction

References

External links
"Blue Angel" entry at cyndilauper.com
"Blue Angel" album Discog entry

Cyndi Lauper albums
1980 debut albums
Albums produced by Roy Halee
Polydor Records albums
Blue Angel (band) albums